The Richmond Spiders men's basketball team represents the University of Richmond in Richmond, Virginia and currently competes in the Atlantic 10 Conference. The team plays its home games at the Robins Center. The team last played in the NCAA Division I men's basketball tournament in 2022 under head coach Chris Mooney, who has guided the program since the 2005–2006 season.

UR's basketball program has developed a reputation as a "giant killer" in the NCAA tournament, defeating the Charles Barkley-led Auburn Tigers in 1984, reaching the Sweet Sixteen in 1988 by defeating defending national champion Indiana and Georgia Tech, beating #3 seeded South Carolina in 1998, and becoming the first #15 seed to knock off a #2 seed when the Spiders defeated Syracuse in 1991. The Spiders hold the distinction of being the only basketball program to win NCAA tournament games as a 12, 13, 14, and 15 seed.

History

Coaches

Current coaching staff
Chris Mooney – Head Coach (on medical leave through end of season)
Peter Thomas – Interim Head Coach
David Boyden – Assistant Coach
Will Gipe – Assistant Coach

All-time head coaches

Players

All-time statistic leaders

Points

Rebounds

Assists

Retired numbers

Three Spider players have had their numbers retired by the University.

All-time postseason results

NCAA tournament

The Spiders have appeared in ten NCAA tournaments. Their combined record is 9–10.

NIT
The Spiders have appeared in ten National Invitation Tournaments.  Their combined record is 11–10.

*The NIT in 2006 began using a seeding and region system similar to what is used in the NCAA tournament.

CBI
The Spiders have appeared in three College Basketball Invitational tournaments. Their combined record is 3–3.

NBA draft history
The following Spider players have been selected in the National Basketball Association draft:

References

External links